Events from the year 1515 in art.

Events
Giovanni Antonio da Brescia's engraving of the Belvedere Torso attracts the interest of connoisseurs and artists outside Rome.

Works

 Giovanni Bellini – Naked Young Woman in Front of the Mirror
 Cima da Conegliano – Virgin and Child with Saints and Donors (Cleveland Museum of Art)
 Piero di Cosimo – The Myth of Prometheus (series)
 Lucas Cranach the Elder – The Massacre of the Innocents (approximate date)
 Gerard David – Virgin and Child with Four Angels (approximate completion date)
 Albrecht Dürer  
"Arch of Honor" (printed 1517/18)
The Rhinoceros (woodcut)
 Innocenzo di Pietro Francucci da Imola – The Virgin and Child with Saints Sebastian, Roch, Cosmas and Damian
 Jan Gossaert – The Adoration of the Kings
 Matthias Grünewald – Isenheim Altarpiece (Unterlinden Museum, Colmar, Alsace)
 Leonardo da Vinci – Bacchus
 Jacopo Pontormo – Pharaoh with his Butler and Baker
 Raphael
Portrait of Baldassare Castiglione (probable date)
Portrait of Bindo Altoviti
La velata
 Titian (some dates approximate)
Noli me tangere
Salome
Tarquin and Lucretia (attributed)
Vanity
Violante
Woman with a Mirror
Young Woman in a Black Dress

Births
October 4 - Lucas Cranach the Younger, German painter and wood-engraver (died 1586) 
probable
Jean Bullant, French sculptor and architect (died 1578)
Nicolas Denisot, French Renaissance poet and painter (died 1559)
Willem Key, Flemish painter (died 1568)
(born 1515/1520) Lambert Sustris, Dutch painter (died 1584)

Deaths
November 5 – Mariotto Albertinelli, Italian Renaissance painter (born 1474)
date unknown - Pietro Lombardo, Italian Renaissance sculptor and architect (born 1435)
probable
Giulio Campagnola, Italian engraver and painter, inventor of the stipple technique in engraving (born 1482)
Vincenzo Foppa, Italian painter (born 1430)

References

 
Years of the 16th century in art